Hafei, officially Hafei Motor Co., Ltd., is a Chinese automaker currently operating as a subsidiary of Changan Ford, and manufacturing passenger vehicles.

It previously independently manufactured sedans, MPVs, mini vehicles, small trucks, and vans for commercial use.

History

Hafei was formerly owned by Aviation Industry Corporation of China. The earliest Hafei products were Suzuki Carry-based microvans and trucks sold under the Songhuajiang brand, named after the Songhua River, but by 2002 they were sold directly under the Hafei brand. Their vehicles have always carried the "HFJ" identity code, no matter the brand.

As of 2009, the company had exported products to a total of 40 nations.

In 2009 the Chang'an Automobile Group purchased most Hafei-related assets prompted by a Chinese State policy aimed at consolidating the domestic automobile manufacturing industry.

In 2015, Changan announced it would discontinue all Hafei production and convert existing lines to serve Changan Ford.

Production bases
Hafei has production facilities in Northern China.

Historical Models

Hafei produced small cars and MPVs in addition to small trucks and commercial vans. These so-called mini vehicles made up the majority of the Hafei model line. Many Hafei consumer offerings were designed by Pininfarina.

Model list
Baili, a small city car
Lobo, a small city car, Pininfarina-designed
Zhongyi, Pininfarina-designed
Zhongyi V5, a microvan based on the Chana Star 5
Junyi, a microvan based on the Chana Star S460, first new product after its acquisition by Chang'an.
Ruiyi, a mini pickup based on the Hafei Zhongyi
Minyi, (Xinminyi/Luzun-Xiaobawang) a microvan and pickup
Luzun-Dabawang,  a microvan
Xiaobawang, a microvan
Saibao III, Pininfarina-designed compact sedan
 The Coda Sedan electric car from Coda Automotive used the Saibao III body with different front and rear fascias. This variant may have been available in parts of China c. 2013.
Saibao V, Pininfarina-designed compact to midsize sedan
Saima, a license-built Mitsubishi Dingo is a small city car added to the Hafei product line in April 2001.
Hafei Songhuajiang HFJ6350, a license-built rebadged eighth generation Suzuki Carry, This model had wide popularity in China during the 1990s.
Hafei Songhuajiang HFJ7080D/HFJ7130, a sedan rebadged from the Yulon Sunny 303. Assembling took place between 1992 and 1993 and was fitted with a 1.3 litre Mitsubishi engine.

Gallery

References

External links

Hafei Automobile Group Official Website 
Hafei Automobile Group Official Website 

Truck manufacturers of China
Car manufacturers of China
Companies based in Harbin
Vehicle manufacturing companies established in 1950
Cars of China
1950 establishments in China
Chinese brands